At the end of 1995 the side moved from the Dongdaemun Stadium in Seoul to the Mokdong Stadium on the western edge of Seoul, as part of K-League's decentralization policy.

Three clubs based in Seoul – the Yukong Elephants, LG Cheetahs, and Ilhwa Chunma – did not accept this policy, so the Seoul government gave an eviction order to the three clubs.  However they guaranteed that if clubs built a soccer-specific stadium in Seoul, they could have a Seoul franchise and return to Seoul.  As a result, the three clubs were evicted from Seoul to other cities.  The Yukong Elephants moved to the city of Bucheon, a satellite city of Seoul, (25 km away).  Mid-way through the 1997 season, the club re-branded itself as Bucheon SK.  

Because the city of Bucheon did not have a stadium, they used Mokdong Stadium in Seoul until 2000.  At the start of the 2001 season, the team moved to the 35,545 seat Bucheon Leports Complex.

Jeju United FC (Bucheon Yukong / Bucheon SK) seasons 1996-2005 statistics 

{|class="wikitable"
|-bgcolor="#efefef"
! Season
! K-League
! Played
! W
! D
! L
! F
! A
! PTS
! League Cup
! FA Cup
! Manager
|-
|1996
|align=right|4th
|align=right|32
|align=right|13
|align=right|9
|align=right|10
|align=right|55
|align=right|51
|align=right|48
|align=right|Winner
|align=right|Semi Final
|Valeri Nepomniachi
|-
|1997
|align=right|10th
|align=right|18
|align=right|2
|align=right|5
|align=right|11
|align=right|19
|align=right|36
|align=right|11
|align=right|5th
|align=right|Quarter Final
|Valeri Nepomniachi
|-
|1998
|align=right|7th
|align=right|18
|align=right|9
|align=right|0
|align=right|9
|align=right|28
|align=right|28
|align=right|24
|align=right|Runners-up
|align=right| First Round
|Valeri Nepomniachi
|-
|1999
|align=right|3rd
|align=right|29
|align=right|18
|align=right|0
|align=right|11
|align=right|48
|align=right|41
|align=right|47
|align=right|5th
|align=right|Quarter Final
|Cho Yoon-Hwan
|-
|2000
|align=right|Runners-up
|align=right|32
|align=right|18
|align=right|0
|align=right|14
|align=right|54
|align=right|45
|align=right|41
|align=right|Winner
|align=right|Semi Final
|Cho Yoon-Hwan
|-
|2001
|align=right|7th
|align=right|27
|align=right|7
|align=right|14
|align=right|6
|align=right|29
|align=right|29
|align=right|35
|align=right|10th
|align=right|Second Round
|Cho Yoon-Hwan / Choi Yun-Gyeom
|-
|2002
|align=right|8th
|align=right|27
|align=right|8
|align=right|8
|align=right|11
|align=right|32
|align=right|40
|align=right|32
|align=right|5th
|align=right|Round of 16
|Choi Yun-Gyeom / Tınaz Tırpan
|-
|2003
|align=right|12th
|align=right|44
|align=right|3
|align=right|12
|align=right|29
|align=right|39
|align=right|73
|align=right|21
|align=right|
|align=right|Semi Final
|Tınaz Tırpan / Ha Jae-Hoon
|-
|2004
|align=right|13th
|align=right|24
|align=right|4
|align=right|13
|align=right|7
|align=right|19
|align=right|27
|align=right|25
|align=right|11th
|align=right|Runners-up
|Jung Hae-Seong
|-
|2005
|align=right|5th
|align=right|24
|align=right|12
|align=right|6
|align=right|6
|align=right|26
|align=right|18
|align=right|42
|align=right|4th
|align=right|Round of 16
|Jung Hae-Seong
|}

References 

 Jeju United FC 30 years History on official website

1996-2005